Carlo Chatrian is an Italian journalist and the artistic director of the Berlin International Film Festival (Berlinale).

Biography
Carlo Chatrian graduated in Literature and Philosophy from Turin University in 1994. As a film critic he works regularly for the magazines Filmcritica, Duellanti, Cineforum and is director of Panoramiques.

As a programmer and curator Carlo Chatrian worked with various festivals and film institutions:  – Museo nazionale del Cinema, Turin (1994)  – Filmmaker Doc, Milan (1995–2005)  – Alba International Film Festival (Deputy Director 2001–2007)  – Courmayeur Noir Film Festival (Curator section Doc Noir 2002–2010)  – Locarno Film Festival (Artistic Director 2012–2018, Member of the selection committee 2006–2009, Curator retrospective since 2008)  – Festival dei Popoli, Florence (Member of the selection committee since 2008, Head of selection since 2011)  – Cinéma du réel, Paris (2010)  – Swiss Film Archive, Lausanne (Advisor since 2010)  – Visions du Réel, Nyon (Programmer since 2011)  – Foundation Film Commission Vallée d'Aoste (Director since 2011).

On September 4, 2012, Carlo Chatrian was nominated artistic director at the Festival del film Locarno.

In June 2018, he was named as the new artistic director of the Berlin International Film Festival (Berlinale), to assume this position in 2020 in collaboration with Mariette Rissenbeek as executive director.

Bibliography
Chatrian has published numerous monographs on filmmakers such as Wong Kar Wai, Johan van der Keuken, Frederick Wiseman, Errol Morris, Maurizio Nichetti and Nanni Moretti; he wrote several essays for magazines and film publications.

Selection of publications: 
Alovisio, Silvio / Chatrian, Carlo (1997): Le ceneri del tempo. Il cinema di Wong Kar Wai. TraccEdizioni, Piombino.
Brianzoli, Giorgia / Chatrian, Carlo (1999): Il mulino delle immagini. GS Editrice, Santhia.
Brianzoli, Giorgia / Chatrian, Carlo / Mosso, Luca (2000): Paesaggi umani. Filmmaker Editrice, Milano.
Chatrian, Carlo / Mosso, Luca (2002): In prima persona. Il cinema di Errol Morris. Il castoro, Milano.
Barisone, Luciano / Chatrian, Carlo / Nazzaro, Giona A. (2003): Io, un altro. Effata Edizioni, Cantalupa.
Barisone, Luciano / Chatrian, Carlo (2003): Nicolas Philibert. Effata Edizioni, Cantalupa.
Causo, Massimo / Chatrian, Carlo (2005): Maurizio Nichetti. Effata Edizioni, Cantalupa.
Chatrian, Carlo / Renzi, Eugenio (2008): Nanni Moretti. Entretiens. Cahiers du Cinéma.
Chatrian, Carlo / Persico, Daniela (2008): Claire Simon. Milano.
Chatrian, Carlo / Paganelli, Grazia (2010): Manga Impact. Phaidon, London.

References

1971 births
Italian film critics
Italian journalists
Italian male journalists
Italian male writers
Living people
Locarno Festival
University of Turin alumni